is a Japanese former professional footballer who played as a centre-back. Someya came up through the youth teams of FC Tokyo and represented Ryutsu Keizai University in the Japan Football League. He then went on to play over 300 games throughout his professional career, playing for Kyoto Sanga, Cerezo Osaka and Kashiwa Reysol. He retired from playing at the end of the 2022 season and took up a role as a coach in Kashiwa Reysol's academy.

Career statistics

Honours
Kashiwa Reysol
J2 League: 2019

References

External links

1986 births
Living people
Ryutsu Keizai University alumni
Association football people from Tokyo
Japanese footballers
J1 League players
J2 League players
Kyoto Sanga FC players
Cerezo Osaka players
Kashiwa Reysol players
Association football defenders